Sonqorabad (also Romanized as Sonqorābād) is a village in Garmeh-ye Shomali Rural District, Kandovan District, Meyaneh County, East Azerbaijan Province, Iran. At the 2006 census, its population was 444, in 108 families.

References 

Populated places in Meyaneh County